Maria Barbara Krafft (1 April 1764 – 28 September 1825) was an Austrian painter, best remembered today for her widely reproduced posthumous portrait of Wolfgang Amadeus Mozart.

Life and career
She was born in Iglau (now Jihlava, in the Czech Republic) where her father, the Austrian Imperial court painter Johann Nepomuk Steiner, was working at the time. She was taught painting by her father and accompanied him to Vienna, where she exhibited her first painting in 1786 at the Academy of Fine Arts.

In 1789 she married the Viennese pharmacist Josef Krafft. Their son Johann August Krafft, born in 1792 and taught by his mother, later became a painter and lithographer. For various periods between 1794 and 1803 Krafft worked and travelled alone in Jihlava, Salzburg, and Prague, achieving increasing success primarily as a portrait painter, but also producing genre and religious works. By 1804 she was separated from her husband and settled in Salzburg where she lived until 1821. In the last four years of her life, she was the appointed City Painter in Bamberg where she painted 145 paintings. She died at the age of 61.

References

Wacha, Georg (1969). "Krafft, Barbara (Maria)". Österreichisches Biographisches Lexikon 1815–1950 Volume 4, pp. 187–188. Austrian Academy of Sciences.   
Greer, Germaine (2001). The Obstacle Race: The Fortunes of Women Painters and Their Work. Tauris Parke.

External links

Portrait miniatures by Barbara Krafft: Portrait of Josepha Hoeggenstaller and Portrait of an Austrian woman at Boris Wilnitsky Fine Arts 

1764 births
1825 deaths
18th-century Austrian painters
19th-century Austrian painters
Austrian women painters
Austrian portrait painters
19th-century Austrian women artists
18th-century Austrian women artists
People from Jihlava